This is a list of the islands in the Shark Bay area of the Gascoyne Region of Western Australia, (between 24°30′0″ and 26°30′0″ S, and 112°0′0″ and 114°30′0″ E).

There are approximately 30 small islands in Shark Bay; all are within the World Heritage Reserve.

The largest is Dirk Hartog Island.

See also
 List of islands of Western Australia

References

Islands, Shark Bay
Shark Bay